A hechsher ("prior approval"; plural: hechsherim) is a rabbinical product certification, qualifying items (usually foods) that conform to the requirements of Jewish religious law.

Forms
A hechsher may be a printed and signed certificate displayed at a commercial venue or on a media advertisement advising the consumer that the subjected product is kosher. Such certificates usually display the name of the rabbinical court issuing the hechsher, the name of the business or product, date of issue, expiry date and stamp of rabbi who issued the certificate.

It may also be a certification marking on individual retail packaging of items which have been certified as Kosher. This marking is usually a basic stamp or emblem indicating the issuing rabbinical court. Modern hechsherim display sophisticated holograms and seals which are hard to forge.

Types
A hechsher is typically issued for food products, and is also issued on non-food items which come in contact with foods, such as cleaning agents and disposable cutlery, certifying that its ingredients do not contain any animal extracts or other halakhically prohibited substances.

The dietary laws of kashrut specify food items that may be eaten and others that are prohibited as set out in the commandments of the Torah.

Observant Jews  will generally only eat permitted foods. To assist Jewish consumers, rabbinic authorities produce and regulate their own hechsherim. It is usually Orthodox rabbis who assume the jobs of mashgichim (singular masculine mashgiach or singular feminine mashgicha, "supervisor"). This means that they will "supervise" the products and processes that manufacture kosher food to ensure compliance with the required standards. The mashgichim allow the manufacturer to apply a hechsher to the packaging of the product only if it is found to contain only kosher ingredients and produced following halakha.

The rabbi may also apply additional words or letters after the hechsher to denote whether the product contains meat (often denoted "Meat"), dairy (D or Dairy), neither meat nor dairy (Pareve), whether the product is Kosher for Passover because it contains no chametz (P), whether the product is Pas Yisroel (bread baked at least in part by a Jew), cholov yisroel (milk whose extraction was done by or under the supervision of a Jew), or whether the product is yoshon (lit. "old": all grain contents took root before the previous Passover).

It is also common for rabbis to issue a hechsher on religious accessories, such as tefillin, mezuzot and tzitzit, which must be produced according to specific halakhic procedures and requirements. Other items which are used for religious practice such as Four Species bear a hechsher testifying that they confirm to halakhic requirements.

In Israel, it is common for manufacturers of all kinds to display a hechsher on products or in commercial advertisements, certifying that their production was not done during the Shabbat.

History

Seals

The Babylonian Talmud cites an early example of a kashrut seal: the seal of the Kohen Gadol on jugs containing olive oil used in the Jewish Temple for the lighting of the Menorah. The Menorah has since become a symbol for purity in Jewish tradition.

'LMLK seals' (bearing the Hebrew letters למלך, equivalent to LMLK) were stamped on the handles of large storage jars mostly in and around Jerusalem during the reign of King Hezekiah (circa 700 BC), based on several complete jars found in situ buried under a destruction layer caused by Sennacherib at Lachish. None of the original seals have been found, but about 2,000 impressions (also referred to as stamps) made by at least 21 seal types have been published.

The practice of marking food as a sign of kashrut can be dated back as far as the 6th century CE. A clay stamp bearing a Menorah image from this period was discovered in an excavation near Acre, Israel in 2011. According to archeologists, local Jews stamped their dough with Menorah impressions while preparing bread, in order for consumers to verify its kashrut.

Certification
An 11th-century certificate found in the Cairo Geniza written by a rabbinical court, testified the kosher status "according to rabbinic law" of the cheeses being sold by a Karaite grocer, Yefet b. Meshullam of Jerusalem. The document explains that the cheese was produced in a factory on the Mount of Olives that followed rabbinic practice. The certificate reads: "The cheeses are kosher and it is appropriate for Rabbanite Jews to purchase them. We grant this permission only after having made a formal purchase from him and having witnessed an oath he took on the holy Torah." While Karaite and Rabbanite communities in this period were theologically at odds, they often maintained good social and economic relations. It was obviously as important for the Karaite grocer to do business with Rabbanite customers as it was for the latter to be able to rely on the religious acceptability of his products.

Specific authorities

In America, one of the best known hechsher symbols is the "OU" from Orthodox Union Kosher the world's largest kosher certification agency, under the auspices of the Orthodox Union. As of 2010, it supervises more than 400,000 products in 8,000 plants in 80 different countries.

In Britain, the largest hechsher symbol in Europe,  is the "KLBD" of the London Beth Din based in London. The "MK" symbol of the Manchester Beth Din is also a globally recognised symbol, listed  by many international brands.

Other hechsher include: OK Kosher Certification based in Brooklyn, New York, Star-K based in Baltimore, Maryland, EarthKosher Kosher Certification Agency with offices in Colorado, New York and Israel, the logo of both the Johannesburg and Cape Town Beth Din used in South Africa, MK Va'ad Ha'ir based in Montreal, Quebec, Canada, and The Kashrut Authority based in Sydney, Australia. The largest number of agencies is in the USA.

Kashrus Magazine publishes a bi-annual guide to almost all kosher supervision agencies worldwide; its 2019 Kosher Supervision Guide (226 pages including an index) features 1,427 agencies. A bi-annual supplement of some 32 pages is published in alternate years. The latest supplement was published in September 2021 and brought the number of agencies listed to 1,493.

Spelling
At the 2006 Scripps National Spelling Bee, contestant Saryn Hooks correctly spelled "hechsher", but her spelling was ruled incorrect. A few minutes later, the judges realized their printed spelling of "hechscher" was incorrect and reinstated Hooks, thanks to 7th grader Lucas Brown, who noticed the error and called it to the attention of his father.

See also
Chadash
Civil laws regarding kashrut
Kashrut
Kosher foods
Kosher tax conspiracy theory
Magen Tzedek

References

External links
Hechshers.info

Religious consumer symbols
Hebrew words and phrases in Jewish law